Community Regional Medical Center (CRMC) is a 685-bed regional hospital and trauma center in Fresno, California. It hosts the Medical Education program of UCSF Fresno, part of a leading medical school in the United States.

CRMC is owned by Community Medical Centers, a private nonprofit health system with four hospitals as well as long-term care and other facilities. It began in 1897 with the Burnett Sanitarium, which was sold to the nonprofit corporation Fresno Community Hospital in 1945.

Community Regional Medical Center is one of 15 level I trauma centers in California. In 2018, it had the eighth-most Medicare inpatient discharges in California, of 808 total.

In 2020, its neurosurgical trauma services were reinstated after a brief suspension of services.

See also 
 University of California, San Francisco

References

External links 
 Official Website
 This hospital in the CA Healthcare Atlas A project by OSHPD

Buildings and structures in Fresno, California
Teaching hospitals in California
Trauma centers